This is a list of fictional characters from the ABC television series Pushing Daisies.

Main characters

Ned

Ned (Lee Pace) is a 29-year-old pie maker with a unique magical ability to be able to bring back to life anyone or anything that is dead. He owns his own pie restaurant, called The Pie Hole, and also uses his gift to aid Emerson Cod, a private investigator, by bringing dead people back to life to find out how they died, though they can only stay alive for one minute before something else must die in their place.

Ned had a childhood crush on his neighbor, Charlotte "Chuck" Charles. The two shared a first kiss at the neighboring funerals of Chuck's father and Ned's mother, but the two lost touch immediately afterwards when Ned was sent away to boarding school by his father. Twenty years later, Ned learns of an unaccompanied female tourist, dubbed the "lonely tourist", murdered on a cruise ship, and soon discovers that the woman is his long-lost love. He revives Chuck at the funeral home to ask her who killed her, but cannot bring himself to re-dead her when her minute of life is up, allowing her to live instead (and inadvertently causing the larcenous funeral director to die in her place.)

Chuck and Ned soon develop strong feelings for each other and begin a relationship; however, they cannot touch at all, as doing so would kill Chuck. However, Ned and Chuck find other ways to express affection: they kiss each other while encased in body bags and while holding a sheet of plastic wrap between their lips.

The character of Ned as a nine-year-old is played by Field Cate.

Charlotte "Chuck" Charles
Charlotte Charles (Anna Friel), usually called Chuck, is Ned's childhood neighbor and boyhood crush. Raised by her two agoraphobic aunts, Chuck is murdered on a cruise ship under mysterious circumstances. Ned brings her back to life, but his feelings for her prevent him from rescinding the usually-temporary resurrection; the two enter a renewed relationship with each other, although Ned has to be very careful not to touch her again. She has a wealth of information on odd and uncommon topics due to reading a large variety of books while growing up in a relatively repressed environment. She can also speak various languages such as French, German, Swedish, Chinese and Japanese. She is an avid beekeeping enthusiast. She has a kind, free-spirited nature which contrasts Ned's more aloof demeanor.

When Olive Snook went to the convent, Chuck moved into Olive's apartment, which neighbors Ned's, to work on developing her own life after her resurrection. She later becomes Olive's roommate after Olive returned from the convent, also revealing that Chuck's aunt Lily was actually her mother.

Eight-year-old Charlotte is played by actress Sammi Hanratty.

Emerson Cod
Emerson Cod (Chi McBride) is the private detective who enlists the help of the pie-maker in solving murder cases. He is also an avid knitter and knits in stressful circumstances.

In the final episode of the first season, it is revealed that Emerson has a daughter whom he has not seen in 7 years. To this end, he authors a pop-up book entitled Lil' Gumshoe designed to help her find her way home. After several publisher rejections and sharp criticism from his mother, Emerson rewrites it and is finally accepted for publication. He is reunited with his former lover, Lila Robinson who makes a deal with him: to help her get the police off her back or he'll never see his daughter, Penny again. Emerson agrees and keeps this deal, but only seeing her briefly as a car drives away. In the second season, Emerson is in a relationship with Simone Hundin.
In the series finale, Emerson is reunited with his daughter after she reads Lil' Gumshoe.

Young Emerson is played by Steven Wash Jr.

Narrator
The narrator (voiced by Jim Dale) is an omniscient voice who narrates the series, commonly beginning the expositions about case information with the phrase "The facts were these".  The voice also lists any measurement of time (people's ages, intervals since a particular event, or how long ago something happened) to the minute.

Lily and Vivian Charles
Lily (Swoosie Kurtz) and Vivian Charles (Ellen Greene) are Charlotte's aunts and only living family.

In their teen years the two sisters were an internationally famous synchronized swimming duo called the "Darling Mermaid Darlings." They adopted their surname in adulthood when their mother married Charles's father. Both sisters were also romantically linked to Charles. Vivian was engaged to him, while Lily had an affair with him and accidentally got pregnant with Charlotte. To keep the secret of the affair and her pregnancy from Vivian, Lily secretly lived at a convent, telling Vivian she was in France. Charlotte was raised to believe that Lily was only her step-aunt, and that her mother was a woman named Susan who died in childbirth. Vivian did know that Charles had cheated on her, but not with Lily.

They gave up their swimming career after Lily lost sight in her right eye while cleaning a litter box. They gradually became shut-ins. After Charles Charles's death, they became Charlotte's guardians. As their social phobias progressed, Charlotte stayed at home in order to take care of them, while making feeble attempts to get them to go outside. After Charlotte's murder, Lily and Vivian struggle to live on their own. After Charlotte is revived, she is unable to see Lily and Vivian, because Ned doesn't want his secret gift known. Charlotte, however, still continues to care for them by sending pies from The Pie Hole with mood enhancers baked into the crust. Her ultimate goal is to inspire Lily and Vivian to overcome their social phobias and restart their synchronized swimming careers. Lily and Vivian become close friends with Olive Snook, who delivers the pies to their Coeur d'Coeur address, which is outside the regular delivery zone. The sisters are also acquainted with Ned and Emerson, who pay them occasional visits.

Both sisters are agoraphobic, bird lovers, and connoisseurs of fine cheese. They also suffer from separation anxiety, as demonstrated in their unusual practice of stuffing their pet birds after they die. Vivian also confesses to Ned that she sometimes puts pillows in Charlotte's bed and pretends she is sleeping. Their personalities also significantly contrast, with Vivian being the hopeful, albeit naive sister, while Lily is the perpetual pessimist and is more confrontational. Lily suffers from severe coulrophobia (fear of clowns) and is a heavy drinker. Their names also reference their personalities as well as the life and death theme of the series: "Vivian" meaning "alive", while "Lily" references the flower often associated with funerals.

Olive Snook
Olive Snook (Kristin Chenoweth) is the waitress at Ned's restaurant and his next-door neighbor.  She is romantically interested in Ned but is often thwarted from pursuing her interest, due at first to the piemaker's social aversion and later to Chuck "faking her own death" and coming out of nowhere. She developed a relationship with Chuck's aunts when she began delivering pies to them, but has not told them of Chuck's continued presence to avoid hurting them. But when she was fed another secret, that of Lily being Chuck's mother, she felt too much pressure to keep all of the secrets, so she quit her job at the Pie Hole and Lily transferred her to a nunnery.  However, soon after the murder of one of the nuns, she returned to the Pie Hole, bringing the nunnery's truffle-hunting sow, Pigby.  Before working at the Pie Hole she used to be a jockey, where one case saw her as the target for a serial killer. Olive becomes particularly close to Emerson over the course of several adventures, who is fond of her energetic personality and shares her feelings of being an outsider when around Ned and Chuck. Because of Olive's diminutive stature, Emerson takes to affectionately calling her, "Itty Bitty."  In the series finale, Olive Snook opens a restaurant dedicated to making Macaroni and Cheese.

When she is faced with a "relationship" problem with Ned, she breaks into song. The first time she sings in the series is in the episode "Dummy," she sings "Hopelessly Devoted To You," from Grease. The narrator introduced her singing as follows:
"Olive often imagined there was an orchestra in her heart. Music heard only by her except when her heart broke open and it spilled out into the world." In the end, Olive begins a relationship with a taxidermist named Randy Mann. Nine-year-old Olive is played by Samantha Bailey in "Bad Habits" and Ellery Sprayberry in "Window Dressed to Kill."

Kristin Chenoweth won the Primetime Emmy Award for Outstanding Supporting Actress in a Comedy Series for her role as Olive Snook.

Digby
Digby is Ned's Golden Retriever, who was hit by an 18-wheeler truck and subsequently becomes the first creature that the young Ned brings back to life. The fact that Digby is still alive and well twenty years later would seem to suggest that the resurrection suspends the aging process, but this has yet to be confirmed (however, there may be a slight possibility that any corpse revived by Ned will continue to live so long as he does not touch them again). The pie maker pets Digby with a fake arm, because if he were to touch Digby again, Digby would be dead forever. The dog is intelligent enough to understand this, and avoids touching Ned himself. Digby also spends a significant amount of his time with Olive.

Digby is played by two dogs, Orbit and Orion.

Recurring characters

The Coroner
The Coroner (Sy Richardson) works at the City Morgue where Ned, Emerson, and Chuck inspect (and secretly interrogate) dead bodies.  He is often suspicious of all three of them and voices it by simply saying, "Mmmmmm-hmmmm." He has started hitting up Emerson for bribe money to keep quiet about his inspections. Emerson reluctantly pays him, but only because he believes it's simply for business. Series creator Bryan Fuller planned a slow reveal of the coroner's homosexuality and his crush on Emerson Cod (Chi McBride).

Alfredo Aldarisio
Alfredo Aldarisio (Raúl Esparza) is a homeopathic salesman who has a fear that Earth's atmosphere could be sucked away from space and treats himself with his own herbal wares.  He secretly admires Olive Snook and gave Chuck a sample pack of antidepressants.  Olive also secretly admires him, even though she still longs for the Pie Maker, but she has not yet had a chance to tell him this due to his going away on a trip.

Oscar Vibenius
Oscar Vibenius (Paul Reubens) is an olfactory expert who works for the Department of Water and Power. He was almost framed by his former partner, Napoleon LeNez, for attempting to kill him, when in fact LeNez was staging his own attempts to try to publicize his latest book. He becomes intrigued with Chuck after noticing something slightly different in her scent, and he stole her mother's sweater to further investigate his suspicions. In "Corpsicle", Chuck gave him a sample of her hair so that he could continue his investigation into her scent, but he returned it to her without testing it in an effort to gain her trust. Beforehand, he had also shaved Digby's behind, as he was also interested in his peculiar scent.

Simone Hundin
Simone Hundin (Christine Adams) is a dog breeder whose husband was murdered in "Bitches". During the investigation- which was complicated as the victim mentioned he was killed by his wife in his last minute 'alive' before revealing that he was a polygamist- she and Emerson became romantically interested in one another, but nothing became of it. Later on, during an investigation in "Dim Sum, Lose Some", the two of them run into each other and become involved. However, Emerson is frightened by the degree of control she has over him, and tries to avoid her. Simone gets angry, and tells him off (and indirectly solves the case). Impressed by how she had opened up, Emerson apologized to Simone, and the two of them got back together. She appeared again in "Water and Power" where she and Emerson Cod are in a relationship.

Dwight Dixon
Dwight Dixon (Stephen Root) was a friend of Charles Charles's and Ned's fathers from the army. He shows up at the Pie Hole after being released from prison, searching for Ned's father. Ned is reluctant to help him, but gives him his father's last known address. It is later revealed that Dwight's intentions are much more sinister than simply a visit, as he is seen brandishing a gun outside of Maurice and Ralston's house. He appears at Lily and Vivian's house soon after, where he reveals to Lily that he knows her secret. He uses Vivian's infatuation with him to find out where a pocket watch that belonged to Charles is, only to find out that they buried the watch with his daughter. He digs up Chuck's grave, finding the casket empty. While dating Vivian in order to obtain more information about the watch, he discovers Chuck is still alive. He breaks into her apartment and steals the watch. Lily, however, finds the watch while in his hotel room and takes it, and Dwight is led to believe that Chuck took back the watch herself. Ultimately, he is found dead in the cemetery when attempting to kill Chuck for the watch, a victim of proximity after Ned revived Charles Charles and Chuck kept him alive for more than a minute.

Maurice and Ralston
Maurice and Ralston (Alex and Graham Miller (adults), Conner and Keenan Merkovich (Age 12), Jason and Kristopher Simmons (Age 5)) are the half-brothers of Ned. When Ned runs away from boarding school and returns home, he finds that his father has remarried and had two sons. Ned goes back to school, never to see his father again.
Ralston, Maurice and Ned's father leaves the twins as well and never returns. Maurice and Ralston's mother went into another relationship, leaving the twins with the house. As an adult, Olive and Chuck learn that Ned has family he never attempted to connect with, and he is "reunited" with them. He later helps them solve the murder of the Great Herrmann, the magician who took on the role of a father figure to the boys after their real father abandoned them at one of his magic shows. They both are magicians.

Ned's mother
Ned's mother (Tina Gloss Finnell) appears only in flashbacks.  She died from a brain aneurysm while baking a pie for Ned in the kitchen of their home.  Ned brought her back to life for more than one minute and as a consequence, accidentally killed Chuck's father, Charles Charles.  That night, Ned's Mother tucked him into his bed and gave him a goodnight kiss, one that ended up being her very last.  This is how Ned learned the rules of his powers: First touch, life, second touch, dead again—forever.

Ned's father
After his mother died, Ned's father (Jon Eric Price in all other episodes, a stand-in in "Bzzzzzzz!") sent him away to the Longborough School for Boys in the town of North Thrush.  His parting words to him were "I'll be back".  This would turn out to be a lie as one Halloween, Ned got a postcard that said he moved away from his house.  So that night, Ned went to the new house to find his father with a new wife and two new twin boys, Maurice and Ralston.  Since Ned was dressed up as a ghost, his father did not recognize him, so he gave him a Honeycomb Chew and wished him a happy Halloween. He later abandoned Maurice and Ralston as well after participating in a disappearing act at a magic show and simply not reappearing. According to Lily, Ned's Father was a "jackass...who did us all a favor [by leaving]."In The Norwegians", he was spotted at the Pie Hole, portrayed by George Hamilton, though Ned failed to see him. He is also implied to be the masked man who saves Ned and Olive's lives in the same episode, as well as having set up a faked chain of evidence so that a group of Norwegian detectives would believe that Dwight Dixon had died of natural causes rather than draw attention to his demise as a result of Ned's gift, suggesting that he is aware of his son's ability.

Calista Cod
Calista Cod (Debra Mooney and Amelia Borella, Amelia plays young Calista). She has only appeared in one episode called "Frescorts." She is Emerson's Mom/Best Friend (As explained by Emerson).

Charles Charles
Charles Charles is the father of Lonely Tourist Charlotte Charles who is found dead while watering his lawn. His death is due to Ned keeping his mother alive for over a minute, and he is the life who died in her place.

Ned decided to revive him to press for more information on Dwight Dixon. When he did, Chuck kept him alive by tricking Ned to touch his gloved hand and he is hidden in Ned's old house. Charles decided to leave town when he did not get along with Ned.

Charles was played by a stand-in in the "Pie-lette", and was played by Josh Randall in "Comfort Food" and "The Legend of Merle McQuoddy".

Pigby
Pigby (played by "Fiona") is a pot-bellied sow whom Olive befriends at the nunnery.  She often hunts for truffles with Olive and once unintentionally killed Olive's best friend there.  When Olive returns home, she got to take Pigby with her. Pigby's name rhymes with the name of Ned's golden retriever, Digby.

Other characters
Other recurring roles include Eugene Mulchandani and Ingmar, who are classmates of Ned in the boarding school, are seen in flashbacks at the beginning of every episode. Other minor recurring roles are the unnamed delivery boy and the news anchor, played by Leyna Nguyen.

References

External links
 Bios at the Pushing Daisies official website

Characters
Pushing Daisies